Hamoun (also Romanized as Hamoon, Hamun, Hāmoun, Hāmoon, and Hāmun) is a 1989 psychological drama film directed by Dariush Mehrjui. The film tells the story of a middle-class Iranian – Hamid Hamoun, played by Khosrow Shakibai – and his struggle after his femme fatale wife, Mahshid, played by Bita Farrahi, demands a divorce from him.

Hamoun has since gained a cult following in Iran.

Plot
Hamid Hamoun who is an executive at a leading import-export firm lives with his wife Mahshid who is a budding artist in abstract painting. Mahshid hails from a rich family but marries the middle class Hamoun after falling for his intellectual tastes and forward views. After 7 years of marriage Mahshid who once was very much in love with Hamoun soon sees him as a constricting force against her desire to do something meaningful with her life. Hamoun who wishes to pursue a career as a writer, while simultaneously preparing for his PhD thesis, occasionally takes out his frustration at his wife.

Mahshid soon demands divorce from him. Hamoun is shocked to find out that his wife loves him no more. The story then depicts Hamoun's incapability to deal with the reality of losing his wife and living with his unfulfilled dreams. The subsequent scenes portray Hamoun's realisations, coupled with dreamlike sequences resembling those from some of Federico Fellini's films.

Hamoun vigorously attempts to meet his teacher Ali, whom he greatly admires, but never does. He then gives his grandmother a visit, the purpose of which is to get a rifle which his grandfather had left. Hamoun unsuccessfully attempts to kill his wife, who is now leading a good life on her own. Driven to the brink of madness by helplessness, Hamoun tries suicide by drowning himself in the sea. Hamoun goes through a dream where all his acquaintances and relatives, including his mother and wife, console him. Hamoun finds out (in the dream) that all his problems have been solved, only to wake up in the boat after being rescued by Ali, his teacher.

Reception
Due to its dream like sequences and the treatment, Hamoun has been described as having a Federico Fellini touch. In 1997, Hamoun was voted the best Iranian film ever made by a survey of Iranian film critics. The Cow by the same director had previously held that honor.

Cast
 Ezzatolah Entezami as Dabiri
 Bita Farahi as Mahshid
 Sedigheh Kianfar as Nurse of hamoun's grandmother
 Turan Mehrzad as Mahshid's Mother
 Jalal Moghadam as Dr. Samavati
 Fathali Oveisi as the Doctor
 Amrollah Saberi as Hamoun's Chief
 Hossein Sarshar as Salimi
 Khosro Shakibai as Hamid Hamoon
 Annik Shefrazian as Hamoun's Grandmother
 Asadollah Yekta as Little Man

References

 In IMDB
 http://www.firstrunfeatures.com/hamoun.html
 In Rotten Tomatoes The New York Times
 In The New York Times
 Spirituality

External links 
 

1989 films
1980s psychological drama films
Iranian drama films
1980s Persian-language films
Films directed by Dariush Mehrjui
Adaptations of works by Søren Kierkegaard
Films about divorce
Films about suicide
Films about writers
Films whose director won the Best Directing Crystal Simorgh
1989 drama films
Films whose writer won the Best Screenplay Crystal Simorgh